A Child From the South was a 1991 television movie about a Nadia (played by Josette Simon), a young journalist, in political exile from South Africa since her father's assassination twenty years earlier and her return to cover a United Nations conference.

It was written by Chris Austin, Gill Bond and Leyga Zendare and directed by Sergio Rezende.

External links

Child From the South, A
1991 drama films
British drama films
1990s English-language films
1990s British films